Advanced Placement (AP) African American Studies (also known as APAAS, or APAFAM) is a pilot college-level course and examination offered to a limited number of high school students in the United States through the College Board's Advanced Placement program. The course will be dedicated solely to learning about and researching the African diaspora and is designed to elevate African-American history and education. 

Starting in the 2023–2024 school year, the pilot course will expand to approximately 200 schools. The course is expected to launch worldwide beginning in August 2024.

History and development

For decades, critics of College Board and advanced placement programs have argued that curricula have focused too much on Euro-centric history. Between 2017 and 2020, College Board partnered with the University of Notre Dame and Tuskegee University to pre-pilot AP African American Studies in 11 selected schools. In 2020, College Board reshaped some curricula among history-based AP courses to further reflect the African diaspora. In 2021, College Board announced that it would be officially piloting AP African American Studies course to begin in the 2022–2023 academic year. The course will be piloted in approximately 60 schools across the United States in its first year. AP African American Studies will be the first ethnic studies course offered by College Board, and the first pilot course since 1952.

According to a source at College Board, topics in the pilot course will range from Queen Nzinga in northern Angola to the Harlem Renaissance and the Black Panthers. Topics will also include lesser-known activists like Valerie Thomas, the African American scientist who invented the Illusion transmitter at NASA. Brandi Waters, the director of the AP African American Studies course development, stated, "this course will offer students across the country a rigorous and inspiring introduction to African American studies." Advocates of the launch of AP African American Studies argue the course will help attract more African American students to AP programs and will bolster minority scores. According to 2019 data, 32% of Black students passed their AP exams compared to 44% of white and Asian students respectively. Some information regarding the course's structure and exam have not been released; College Board will reveal more about the course as the pilot program progresses. Additionally, College Board described that AP African American Students would further "[attract] Black and Latinx high school teachers".

Staff
Brandi Waters is the executive director of AP African American Studies for College Board. Leaders in the field of Black studies, such as Henry Louis Gates, Evelyn Brooks Higginbotham, and Robert Patterson assisted in the creation of the course.

Reaction

Dawn Williams, dean of Howard University's School of Education, said that AP African American Studies consists of a "curriculum that's been vetted for years by experts in the field." In 2022, Gates stated, "Nothing is more dramatic than having the College Board launch an AP course in a field—that signifies ultimate acceptance and ultimate academic legitimacy... AP African American Studies is not CRT. It's not the 1619 Project. It is a mainstream, rigorously vetted, academic approach to a vibrant field of study, one half a century old in the American academy, and much older, of course, in historically Black colleges and universities." The ultimate goal of the course is to teach that Black history is not limited to slavery or the Civil Rights movement.

In a September 2022 opinion column for The Wall Street Journal, Jason L. Riley claimed that the College Board would probably pander to Black students with political indoctrination. College Board CEO David Coleman responded by stating, "There are no points ever awarded on [any] AP exam for agreeing with a point of view. Rather, students encounter evidence and make up their own minds." Daniel Soderstrom, one of the teachers of the pilot course, stated in an interview with CNN, "we're teaching factual information, and everything is verifiable." The course was featured on America in Black, a television show that first aired on BET, VH1, and CBS February 19, 2023, where Soderstrom's class at Ridge View High School was interviewed. The segment highlighted the push-back from conservatives like DeSantis in the implementation of the course, as well as positive reactions from community members and students.

Florida controversy 
Throughout 2022, under the administration of Republican governor Ron DeSantis, Florida state officials had repeated contact with the College Board, often discussing parts of the course found "objectionable." On January 12, 2023, the Florida Department of Education's Office of Articulation sent a letter to College Board saying the course was "inexplicably contrary to Florida law and significantly lacks educational value." The letter reportedly did not specify what was objectionable to the department, but a spokesperson for DeSantis indicated that the course left "large, ambiguous gaps that can be filled with additional ideological material." According to The New York Times, the letter called the course "historically inaccurate" and a violation of Florida state law (likely referring to the Stop WOKE Act passed in Florida in 2022).

DeSantis later gave his reason for the ban as the inclusion of queer theory and intersectionality in the course, as well as content regarding the role prisons play in systemic oppression, and stated that these topics were on “the wrong side of the line for Florida standards”. College Board later revealed that no such forced lessons existed and that students must use evidence from conflicting viewpoints. 

College Board, which finalized the official curriculum prior to the DeSantis announcement, released the current curriculum on February 1, 2023. The work of numerous writers associated with Black feminism and critical race theory continues to be optional, and Black conservatism continues as a suggested research topic. According to Evelyn Brooks Higginbotham, one of the architects of the course, Florida's Department of Education saw "buzzwords" and falsely assumed that the material was required. Rather, Higginbotham maintained, students are expected to use sources from all sides of the political spectrum. In February 2023, in interviews with both CBS and NPR, the president of College Board, David Coleman, and the senior director of the program, Brandi Waters, stated that students will still have access to materials of all political backgrounds and that College Board has not backed down or "watered down its curriculum" because of media attention. Coleman also said that the curriculum was changed well before DeSantis announced the state's intent to ban the course in Florida and that College Board does not "bend to politics."

Course development timeline 
 2017–2020
 Pre-pilot in 11 schools
 February 2022:
 Pilot schools and educators identified and briefed
 July 2022:
 Pilot educators trained at Howard University
 August/September 2022:
 Pilot course launched
 May 2023:
 Pilot course exam
 August/September 2023:
 Additional schools (approximately 200) and educators added to pilot program
 May 2024:
 Pilot course exam II
 August/September 2024:
 Official Course Launch

Course overview

Exam

A pilot exam will be administered in May 2023 and 2024 to prepare for the launching of the course in August 2024. These pilot exams, however, will not be scored like traditional AP exams and their data will not be sent to students, teachers, or colleges and universities.

References

Advanced Placement
Post–civil rights era in African-American history
History education
History of the United States